This is a list of magazines from Singapore.

English 

8 DAYS
Arena Singapore
The Asian Banker Journal
 Asian Scientist
August Man
AdventureFaktory
Beer Travelist
Cosmopolitan Singapore
Calibre
Cask & Drams
Destination
Dwell
Element
Elle Singapore
Esquire Singapore
The Executive Magazine
Go! Singapore Magazine
Expat Living Singapore
Her World
HRM Asia Magazine
Human Capital Magazine
Nylon
Run Singapore
sgCarMart
SG Magazine
Shape
Singapore Business Review
STYLE:
Torque
The Peak
Vanilla Luxury
Sports+Travel Singapore
OG

Malay
Manja
Sensasi
Sutra

Chinese
ICON
 Citta Bella

Bilingual
Nüyou (English, Chinese)

References

 
Singapore
Magazines